Heilipus is a genus of pine weevils in the beetle family Curculionidae. There are more than 280 described species in Heilipus.

See also
 List of Heilipus species

References

Further reading

 
 
 

Molytinae
Articles created by Qbugbot